Imre Fényes (29 July 1917  - 13 November 1977) was a Hungarian physicist who was the first to propose a stochastic interpretation of quantum mechanics.

Selected publications

References

External links
 Imre Fényes biography

1917 births
1977 deaths
People from Békés County
Scientists from Budapest
Franz Joseph University alumni
Academic staff of the University of Debrecen
Academic staff of Eötvös Loránd University
20th-century Hungarian physicists
Theoretical physicists
Quantum physicists